Deloche may refer to:

Surname
 Alain Deloche, (born 1940), French cardiac surgeon and founder of the Chain of Hope
 Campocasso (1833–1908), born Auguste Deloche, director of French theater
 Maximin Deloche (1817–1900), French historian and numismatist, member of the Société des Antiquaires de France
 Pierre Julien Deloche (born 1982), French archer
 Robert Deloche (1909–1988), furrier, trade unionist, politician in France and Algeria

See also
 Loche (disambiguation)
 Loches, a commune in central France
 Loché, an associated commune of Mâcon, France
 Loch (disambiguation)